The 4th Engineer Regiment is a military engineer regiment of the Italian Army based in Palermo in Sicily. Today the regiment is the engineer unit of the Mechanized Brigade "Aosta".

History 
On 1 October 1922 the 3rd Army Corps Engineer Grouping was formed in Verona, which received the Sappers Battalion and the Telegraphers Battalion of the V Army Corps, and a miners company from the disbanded Miners Engineer Regiment. The grouping consisted of a command, a sappers-miners battalion, a telegraphers battalion, a photo-electricians company, three dovecotes (in Verona, Trento, and Bolzano), and a depot. On 1 November 1926 the grouping was renamed 4th Engineer Regiment. In February 1928 the regiment provided a telegraphers company and the dovecote in Treviso for the formation of the 11th Engineer Regiment.

On 1 February 1931 the regiment formed a Miners-Cableway Battalion, which was transferred on 28 October 1932 to the newly formed 2nd Miners Regiment in Verona. On the same date the regiment received the 7th Company/ IV Battalion from the disbanded 2nd Radio-Telegraphers Regiment. On 1 October 1934 the regiment received a radio-telegraphers battalion from the 3rd Engineer Regiment. Afterwards the regiment consisted of a command, a sappers-miners battalion, a telegraphers battalion, a radio-telegraphers battalion, a non-commissioned officer recruits company, three dovecotes, and a depot.

For the Second Italo-Ethiopian War the regiment formed the V Mixed Engineer Battalion for cavalry division, the LI Mixed Engineer Battalion for the 32nd Motorized Division "Trento", and a mixed engineer company for the 5th Alpine Division "Pusteria". The Trento was deployed to Libya to deter British forces in Egypt from closing the Suez Canal for Italian shipping. The Pusteria was deployed to Ethiopia and involved in the Italian campaign. In 1936 the regiment moved from Verona to Bolzano. In January 1937 the telegraphers and radio-telegraphers battalions were renamed connections battalions.

World War II 
With the outbreak of World War II the regiment's depot began to mobilize new units:

 Command of the 9th Engineer Grouping
 II Mixed Engineer Battalion (for the 2nd Alpine Division "Tridentina")
 V Mixed Engineer Battalion (for the 5th Alpine Division "Pusteria")
 LI Mixed Engineer Battalion (for the 102nd Motorized Division "Trento")
 CXXXII Mixed Engineer Battalion (for the 132nd Armored Division "Ariete")
 I Engineer Battalion
 XIII Engineer Battalion
 XXI Engineer Battalion
 XXX Sappers Battalion
 I Mixed Connections Battalion (for the Army of the Po)
 and many smaller units, including the 107th Mixed Telegraphers and Radio-Telegraphers Company

The 9th Engineer Grouping was assigned on 10 June 1940 to the Army of the Po and consisted of the XIII and XXI engineer battalions, I and IX Pontieri battalions, and I Mixed Connections Battalion. On 10 February 1941 the grouping left Verona and moved to Cava dei Tirreni in Campania. In 1943 the grouping moved to Villa Pergusa near Enna in Sicily and was assigned to the Engineer Command of the 6th Army, which was tasked with the defense of the islands. The grouping now consisted of the II Telegraphers Battalion, XI Marconists Battalion, and the CIV and CV miners battalions. The grouping was destroyed during the allied landings on Sicily.

The II Mixed Engineer Battalion was assigned to the 2nd Alpine Division "Tridentina", which was sent to the Eastern Front. Division and battalion were nearly wiped out there during Operation Little Saturn. For its conduct during the campaign the II Mixed Engineer Battalion was awarded a Silver Medal of Military Valour, which today is affixed to the flag of the 4th Engineer Regiment. The regiment and the remaining battalions it had raised were disbanded by invading German forces after the announcement of the Armistice of Cassibile on 8 September 1943.

Cold War 
During the 1975 army reform the army disbanded the regimental level and newly independent battalions were granted for the first time their own flags. During the reform engineer battalions were named for a lake if they supported a corps or named for a river if they supported a division or brigade. On 7 November 1975 the 2nd Engineer Regiment was disbanded and its XIV Army Corps Engineer Battalion in Trento was renamed 4th Engineer Battalion "Orta" and assigned the flag and traditions of the 4th Engineer Regiment. The battalion was assigned to the 4th Alpine Army Corps' Engineer Command and consisted of a command, a command and park company, and three engineer companies.

For its conduct and work after the 1976 Friuli earthquake the battalion was awarded a Bronze Medal of Army Valour, which was affixed to the battalion's flag. The battalion was once again deployed after the 1980 Irpinia earthquake and was awarded a second Bronze Medal of Army Valour. In 1986 the command and park company split into a command and services company, and a special equipment company.

After the Cold War the army undertook a major reorganization of its forces: on 19 September 1992 the 51st Engineer Battalion "Simeto" in Palermo was disbanded and the next day the 4th Pioneer Regiment was reformed with the personnel and materiel of the disbanded battalion. The regiment retained the flag of the Simeto as the flag of the 4th Engineer Regiment was still assigned to the 4th Engineer Battalion "Orta", which on 3 October 1993 was disbanded and the next day the 1st Engineer Regiment was reformed with the personnel and materiel of the disbanded battalion.

On 13 October 1995 the 1st Engineer Regiment was renamed 2nd Engineer Regiment and on 24 October 1995 the flag of the 4th Engineer Regiment arrived in Palermo. Afterwards the flag of the 51st Engineer Battalion "Simeto" was transferred to the Shrine of the Flags in the Vittoriano in Rome. In 2000 the regiment was renamed 4th Engineer Regiment.

Current structure 

As of 2022 the 4th Engineer Regiment consists of:

  Regimental Command, in Palermo
 Command and Logistic Support Company
 Sappers Battalion "Simeto"
 Sappers Company
 Sappers Company
 Sappers Company
 Deployment Support Company

The Command and Logistic Support Company fields the following platoons: C3 Platoon, Transport and Materiel Platoon, Medical Platoon, Commissariat Platoon, and EOD Platoon. Each of the two sapper companies fields a Command Platoon, an Advanced Combat Reconnaissance Teams Platoon, and two sapper platoons. The Deployment Support Company and Mobility Support Company field the battalion's heavy military engineering vehicles: Biber bridgelayers, Dachs armored engineer vehicles, cranes, excavators, Medium Girder Bridges etc. The sapper companies and Command and Logistic Support Company are equipped with VTLM "Lince" and VTMM "Orso" vehicles.

See also 
 Mechanized Brigade "Aosta"

External links
Italian Army Website: 4° Reggimento Genio Guastatori

References

Engineer Regiments of Italy